The 2022 Coastal Carolina Chanticleers baseball team represented Coastal Carolina University during the 2022 NCAA Division I baseball season. The Chanticleers played their home games at Springs Brooks Stadium and were led by twenty-sixth year head coach Gary Gilmore. They were members of the Sun Belt Conference.

Preseason

Sun Belt Conference Coaches Poll
The Sun Belt Conference Coaches Poll was released on February 9, 2022.  Coastal Carolina was picked to finish tied for third with Louisiana with 117 votes and 3 first place votes.

Preseason All-Sun Belt Team & Honors

Preseason Player of the Year
Eric Brown (CCU, Jr, Shortstop)

Preseason Team
Miles Smith (USA, Sr, Pitcher)
Hayden Arnold (LR, Sr, Pitcher)
Tyler Tuthill (APP, Jr, Pitcher)
Brandon Talley (LA, Sr, Pitcher)
Caleb Bartolero (TROY, Jr, Catcher)
Jason Swan (GASO, Sr, 1st Base)
Luke Drumheller (APP, Jr, 2nd Base)
Eric Brown (CCU, Jr, Shortstop)
Ben Klutts (ARST, Sr, 3rd Base)
Christian Avant (GASO, Sr, Outfielder)
Josh Smith (GSU, Jr, Outfielder)
Rigsby Mosley (TROY, Sr, Outfielder)
Cameron Jones (GSU, So, Utility)
Noah Ledford (GASO, Jr, Designated Hitter)

Roster

Personnel

Schedule and results

Schedule Source:
*Rankings are based on the team's current ranking in the D1Baseball poll.

Greenville Regional

Postseason

References

Coastal Carolina
Coastal Carolina Chanticleers baseball seasons
Coastal Carolina Chanticleers baseball
Coastal Carolina